The Hanse Law School is a project of two universities, and was established in 2002. The University of Bremen and the Carl-von-Ossietzky University of Oldenburg jointly offer a bachelor's degree in Comparative and European Law and a master's degree in Transnational Law.

External links
 http://www.hanse-law-school.de/

Law schools in Germany
University of Bremen
University of Oldenburg
2002 establishments in Germany